Art Matthews is an American jazz pianist.  His 1981 album It's Easy To Remember (Baystate) features Archie Shepp, Alan Dawson, Charles Fambrough, Bill Pierce and Dizzy Reece.   He also worked with Shepp on his 1979 recording Attica Blues Big Band.  Lester Bowie's 1982 All the Magic (ECM Records) also showcases his playing.

References

External links
Art Matthews' Matra Productions
Art Matthews' online piano lessons website

American jazz pianists
American male pianists
Year of birth missing (living people)
Living people
21st-century American pianists
21st-century American male musicians
American male jazz musicians